UAAP Season 74 was the 2011–2012 athletic year of the University Athletic Association of the Philippines. It was hosted by Ateneo de Manila University. The men's basketball and the women's volleyball tournaments were aired by ABS-CBN Channel 2 and Studio 23 (the men's basketball games are simulcast over DZSR Sports Radio 918) for the twelfth consecutive year. The opening ceremony was held on July 9, 2011 at the Marikina Sports Center.

Opening ceremonies 
Season host Ateneo de Manila University presented an Olympic-style opening ceremony which was the first time it took place in an open field on July 9, 2011 at the Marikina Sports Park. The highlights of the opening ceremony were the presentation of the UAAP board of directors, parade of athletes, torch relay, cauldron lighting and free concert. It also featured a group of Ateneo graduates singing the UAAP theme song. The Ateneo Blue Babble Battalion and Spongecola's Yael Yuzon provided entertainment during the ceremonies.

The torch relay took place prior to the start of the events in the Marikina Sports Park. The relay started from the De La Salle University campus in Taft Avenue, Malate, Manila and passed thru the campuses of the other seven member schools of the UAAP. Athletes representing their school received and transferred the torch to the next school by means of running. Ateneo was the last school to receive the torch. Thus it had the honor of bringing the torch to its final destination which was the Marikina Sports Park. Former Ateneo basketball player Olsen Racela was the torch lighter which role he did when he lighted the cauldron with the torch after being lifted by a hydraulic conveyor.

The opening ceremony proceeded as scheduled despite continuous rains. Contingency plans were made so that the ceremony will not be called off due to inclement weather. The parade of athletes proceeded with the athletes carrying colored umbrellas corresponding to their school colors. The following schools make up the UAAP: Ateneo de Manila University, Adamson University, De La Salle University, Far Eastern University, National University, University of Santo Tomas, University of the East, and University of the Philippines.

University of Santo Tomas had the largest delegation with 627 athletes. It was followed by Ateneo de Manila (600), University of the East (512), University of the Philippines (425), De La Salle University (417), Adamson University (300), Far Eastern University (300) and National University (260).

Basketball games started the next day at the Smart Araneta Coliseum.

Basketball

The UAAP Season 74 basketball tournament began on July 10, 2011 at the Araneta Coliseum in Cubao, Quezon City. The tournament host was Ateneo de Manila University and tournament commissioner was Andrew "Andy" Jao.

Men's tournament

Elimination round

Playoffs

Awards 
 Most Valuable Player: 
 Rookie of the Year:

Women's tournament

Elimination round

Playoffs

Awards
 Most Valuable Player: 
 Rookie of the Year:

Boys' tournament

Elimination round

Playoffs

Awards 
 Most Valuable Player: 
 Rookie of the Year:

Volleyball

Seniors division

Men's tournament

Elimination round

Team standings

Playoffs

* if necessary

Awards
 Most Valuable Player: 
 Rookie of the Year:

Women's tournament

Elimination round

Team standings

Playoffs

Awards
 Season Most Valuable Player: 
 Finals Most Valuable Player: 
 Rookie of the Year:

Juniors division

Boys' tournament

Elimination round

Team standings

Playoffs

Awards
 Most Valuable Player: 
 Rookie of the Year:

Girls' tournament

Elimination round

Team standings

Awards
 Most Valuable Player:  
 Rookie of the Year:

Beach volleyball
The UAAP Season 74 beach volleyball tournament began on August 27, 2011 at the sand courts of UE Caloocan.

Men's tournament

Elimination round

Team standings
Season host is boldfaced.

Schedule

Playoffs

Awards
 Most Valuable Player: 
 Rookie of the Year:

Women's tournament

Elimination round

Team standings
Season host is boldfaced.

Schedule

Playoffs

Awards
 Most Valuable Player: 
 Rookie of the Year:

Football
The UAAP Season 74 football tournament began on January 14, 2012 at the football fields of the Ateneo de Manila University.

Seniors division

Men's tournament

Elimination round

Team standings

Match-up results

Finals

Awards
 Most Valuable Player: 
 Rookie of the Year:

Women's tournament

Elimination round

Team standings
Host team in boldface.

Match-up results

Finals

Awards
 Most Valuable Player: 
 Rookie of the Year:

Juniors division

Boys' tournament

Elimination round

Team standings
Host team in boldface.

Match-up results

There was no playoff. FEU was automatically declared champion after sweeping the elimination rounds.

Baseball
The UAAP Season 74 baseball tournament began on January 12, 2012 at the baseball diamond of the Rizal Memorial Sports Complex. This year marked the introduction of high school baseball in the UAAP as a demonstration sport. The initial participating schools were Ateneo de Manila University, De La Salle-Santiago Zobel School and University of Santo Tomas High School.

Men's tournament

Elimination round

Team standings
Host team in boldface.

Schedule

Playoffs

Juniors' tournament

Elimination round

Team standings
Host team in boldface.

Schedule

Softball
The UAAP Season 74 softball tournament began on January 11, 2012 at the baseball diamond of the Rizal Memorial Sports Complex. With Adamson sweeping the elimination round, they were declared automatic champions and the playoffs were scrapped.

Women's tournament

Elimination round

Team standings
Host team in boldface.

Match-up results

Awards
 Most Valuable Player: 
 Rookie of the Year:

Tennis
The UAAP Season 74 tennis tournaments began on January 7, 2012 at the Rizal Memorial Tennis Center.

Men's tournament

Elimination round

Team standings
 Host team in boldface.

Schedule

Finals
With De La Salle Green Tennisters sweeping the elimination round, the Final round went through a best-of-three series with the team enjoying the twice-to-beat advantage over the second placer NU Bulldogs. La Salle won the championship title after beating NU (3–2) in one game last February 21, 2012 at the Rizal Memorial Tennis Center.

Awards
 Most Valuable Player: 
 Rookie of the Year:

Women's tournament

Elimination round

Team standings
 Host team in boldface.

Schedule

Playoffs

Second-seed playoff 
Being tied at second place, UST Lady Tennisters defeated UP Lady Tennisters (3–1) on a playoff, the last berth to the Final round, on February 21, 2012 at the Rizal Memorial Tennis Center.

Finals 
With De La Salle Lady Tennisters sweeping the elimination round, the Final round went through a best-of-three series with the team enjoying the twice-to-beat advantage over the playoff winner UST Lady Tennisters. UST forced a rubber match and obtained the championship title after beating La Salle (3–2) in the second game. Finals first and second games were held on February 24 and 26 respectively at the Rizal Memorial Tennis Center.

Awards 
 Most Valuable Player: 
 Rookie of the Year:

Badminton
The UAAP Season 74 badminton tournament began on August 6, 2011 at Badminton Hall, Rizal Memorial Sports Complex.

Men's tournament

Elimination round

Team standings
Season host is boldfaced.

Schedule

Playoffs

Awards
 Season Most Valuable Player: 
 Rookie of the Year:

Women's tournament

Elimination round

Team standings
Season host is boldfaced.

Schedule

Playoffs

Awards
 Season Most Valuable Player: 
 Rookie of the Year:

Track and field
The UAAP Season 74 track and field tournament is a four-day tournament held from February 9–12, 2012 at the Philippine Institute of Sports Arena in Pasig.

Seniors division

Men's tournament

Team standings
 Host team in boldface.

Women's tournament

Team standings
 Host team in boldface.

Awards
 Season Most Valuable Player: 
 Rookie of the Year:

Juniors division

Boys' tournament

Team standings
 Host team in boldface.

Exhibition events

Cheerdance
The UAAP Cheerdance Competition was held on September 17, 2011 at the Smart Araneta Coliseum in Quezon City. The event was covered live by Studio 23 and was hosted by Boom Gonzales and the various UAAP courtside reporters.

 Host team in boldface. "Order" refers to order of performance.
 Stunner awardee:

Street dance
The 2nd UAAP Street Dance Competition was held on March 10, 2012 at the Philippine International Convention Center Forum in Pasay. The event coincided with the awarding ceremony for this season's UAAP.

Host team in boldface.

General championship summary 
The general champion is determined by a point system. The system gives 15 points to the champion team of a UAAP event, 12 to the runner-up, and 10 to the third placer. The following points: 8, 6, 4, 2 and 1 are given to the rest of the participating teams according to their order of finish.

Medals table

Seniors' division

Juniors' division

General championship tally

Seniors' division

Juniors' division

Individual awards
 Athlete of the Year:
 Seniors:
 
 
 Juniors:

References

See also
NCAA Season 87

 
2011 in Philippine sport
74
2012 in Philippine sport